The Men's 200 metres T44 event at the 2012 Summer Paralympics took place at the London Olympic Stadium on 1 and 2 September.
 
 The race was also open to category T43 double amputees, and in the final T43 contestants took all 3 medals.

Records
Prior to the competition, the existing World and Paralympic records were as follows:

Results

Round 1
Competed 1 September 2012 from 20:22. Qual. rule: first 2 in each heat (Q) plus the 2 fastest other times (q) qualified.

Heat 1

Heat 2

Heat 3

Final
Competed 2 September 2012 at 21:15.

 
Q = qualified by place. q = qualified by time. WR = World Record. RR = Regional Record. PB = Personal Best. SB = Seasonal Best.

References

Athletics at the 2012 Summer Paralympics
2012 in men's athletics